Arturo Vittori (born October 1, 1971, in Viterbo, Italy), is an Italian artist, architect, and industrial designer. He is co-founder and director of the architecture and design team Architecture and Vision.

Biography
Arturo Vittori was raised in Bomarzo, Italy. From 1989 to 1993 Vittori studied Fine Arts in Viterbo and in 1993 he began to study architecture at the University of Florence, where, after a two-year experience at the Darmstadt University of Technology in Germany, he graduated in 1996 with an award-winning thesis project entitled “International Space Station: Travelling Network.” In 1997 he did his Master in ‘Technician in Architectural Diagnostic’ in Modena. After that he gained experience collaborating with architects such as Jourda Architects in 1997, Duepiù France in 1998, Santiago Calatrava in 2000 and Jean Nouvel in 2001. In 2002–2004 he was Manager of Cabin Design at Airbus in Toulouse, participating in the interior cabin design for a variety of airline companies and in particular for the A380, currently the largest existing airliner. In 2005 he worked with Future Systems in London, collaborating with Anish Kapoor in the design of the Monte Sant’Angelo subway station in Naples and in 2006 he practiced yacht design at the London-based studio of Francis Design.

In 2003 Vittori co-founded, with the Swiss architect Andreas Vogler co-founded Architecture and Vision, an international and multidisciplinary studio working in architecture and design, engaged in the development of innovative solutions and technology transfer between diverse fields for aerospace and terrestrial applications. In 2006, a prototype of the extreme environment tent, DesertSeal (2004), became part of the permanent collection of The Museum of Modern Art in New York, after being featured in SAFE: Design Takes on Risk (2005), curated by Paola Antonelli. In the same year, the Museum of Science and Industry Chicago selected Vogler and Vittori as “Modern-day Leonardos” for its  Leonardo da Vinci: Man, Inventor, Genius exhibition. In 2007, a model of the inflatable habitat MoonBaseTwo (2007), developed to allow long-term exploration on the Moon, was acquired for the collection of the Museum of Science and Industry Chicago while MarsCruiserOne (2007), the design for a pressurized laboratory rover for human Mars exploration, was shown at the Centre Georges Pompidou in Paris, as part of the exhibition “Airs de Paris” (2007).

Architecture and Vision has realized several transdisciplinary projects in aerospace, architecture and art. Their work is shown in the traveling exhibition named “From Pyramids to Spacecraft”.
Vittori has spoken at numerous international conferences on the topics of aerospace architecture, technology transfer to architecture, sustainability and art.

After 10 years of collaboration Andreas Vogler departed Architecture and Vision to found his own private firm Andreas Vogler Studio.

Projects 
2015
 Warka Water 3.2, Dorze, Ethiopia

2013
 OR of the Future, UIC, Chicago, United States

2012
 WarkaWater, Venice Biennale, Venice, Italy

2011
 LaFenice, Messina, Sicily, Italy
 AtlasCoelestisZeroG, International Space Station
 Corsair International, Paris, France

2009
 AtlasCoelestis, Sullivan Galleries, Chicago, Illinois
 MercuryHouseOne, Venice Biennale, Venice, Italy
 FioredelCielo, Macchina di Santa Rosa, Viterbo, Italy

2007
 BirdHouse, Bird House Foundation , Osaka, Japan

2006
 DesertSeal, permanent collection, Museum of Modern Art (MOMA), New York

Teaching 
IUAV, University of Venice, Venice, Italy, 2008 – 2012
Illinois Institute of Technology (IIT), Chicago, Illinois, 2009
Sapienza University of Rome, Rome, Italy, 2007

Selected exhibitions 

2013 
 From Pyramids to Spacecraft, traveling exhibition
 Children Museum Heliopolis, Cairo, Egypt, February 21 – April 25, 2013 
 Parliament Bucharest, ROCAD, Bucharest, Romania, May 15–19, 2013
 Futuro Textiles, Cité des Sciences et de l’Industrie, Paris, France, February 6 – September 30

2012
 From Pyramids to Spacecraft, traveling exhibition
 Italian Cultural Institute, Hamburg, Germany, March 28 – April 4, 2012
 Robert A. Deshon and Karl J. Schlachter Library for Design, Architecture, Art, and Planning (DAAP), University of Cincinnati, Cincinnati, USA, April 20 – May 11, 2012
 Istituto Italiano di Cultura, Addis Ababa, Ethiopia, May 11–25, 2012 
 American University, Cairo, Egypt, November 19–26, 2012 
 The New Library of Alexandria, Alexandria, Egypt, November 29 – January 15, 2013
 Born out of Necessity, MoMA The Museum of Modern Art, New York, US, March 2, 2012 – January 28, 2013
 AtlasCoelestisZero, Istituto Italiano di Cultura, San Francisco, US, April 17 – May 1, 2012
 WarkaWater, Palazzo Bembo, 13th Int. Architecture Biennale Venice, Italy, August 29 – November 25, 2012

2011
 From Pyramids to Spacecraft, traveling exhibition, Beihang Art Gallery, Beijing, China, March 21–31, 2011
 Shanghai Science and Technology Festival, Pudong Expo, Shanghai, China, May 13–22, 2011
 Living – Frontiers of Architecture III-IV, Louisiana Museum, Humlebaek, Denmark,  June 1 – October 2, 2011

2010  
 From Pyramids to Spacecraft, traveling exhibition The Goldstein Museum of Design, Minneapolis, Minnesota, USA, March 14 – May 2, 2010
 Italian Cultural Institute Tokyo, Japan, June 21 – July 3, 2010
 Great Lakes Science Center, Cleveland, Ohio, USA, October 15 – January 13, 2011 
 Deutscher Pavillon, Architecture Biennale Venice, Italy, August 25 – November 21, 2010

2009
 From Pyramids to Spacecraft, traveling exhibition: Italian Cultural Institute, Chicago, Illinois, United States, March 13 – April 22, 
 Swissnex, San Francisco, California, United States, April 30 – May 20
 Seoul Design Olympiad 2009, Seoul, Korea, October 9–29
 MercuryHouseOne, 53rd Art Biennale Venice San Servolo Island, Venice, Italy, September 2 – October 20,
 FioredelCielo, Palazzo Orsini, Bomarzo, Italy, September 5 – September 7,
 ACADIA, School of the Art Institute Chicago, USA, September 25 – January 9, 2010

2008 
 Fifteen Roman Architects, New Challenges for the City of Tomorrow, come se Gallery, Rome, Italy, March 14–30
 Le Città del Futuro (Cities of Tomorrow), Parco della Musica, Rome, Italy, March 1,

2007
 2057, l’espace des 50 prochaines années, Cité de l’Espace, Toulouse, France, November 27 – February 4, 2008
 Istanbul Design Week 2007, Istanbul, Turkey, September 4–10
 Air de Paris, Centre Pompidou, Paris, France, April 25 – August 15

2006 
 FuturoTextiles, Tri Postal, Lille, France, November 14 – January 14, 2007
 Abenteuer Raumfahrt, Landesmuseum für Technik und Arbeit, Mannheim, Germany, September 28 – April 9, 2007
 Leonardo: Man, Inventor, Genius, Modern-day Leonardos, The Museum of Science and Industry, Chicago, USA, June 14 – Sept 4

2005
 SAFE: Design Takes on Risk, The Museum of Modern Art, New York, United States, November 16 – January 2, 2006

Awards 
2016
  2015–2016 World Design Impact Prize for the Warka Water project, 18.03.2016, Taipei, Taiwan.

References 

 Paola Antonelli (ed.), Safe: Design Takes on Risk, Museum of Modern Art, New York 2005, p. 64. 
 Valérie Guillaume, architecture + vision. Mars Cruiser One 2002-2006, in Airs de Paris,  Diffusion Union-Distribution, Paris 2007, pp. 338–339. 
 Namita Goel, The Beauty of the Extreme, Indian Architect & Builder, March 2006, pp. 82–83.
 Arturo Vittori, Architecture and Vision, in L'Arca, October 2004, 196, pp. 26–38.
 Un veicolo per Marte. Mars Cruiser One, in L'Arca, April 2007, 224, p. 91.
 Ruth Slavid, Micro: Very Small Buildings, Laurence King Publishing, London, pp. 102–106, 
 Wüstenzelt Desert Seal / Desert Seal Tent, in Detail, 2008, 6, pp. 612–614
 Arturo Vittori, Andreas Vogler, Architecture and Vision: From Pyramids to Spacecraft, 
 Dr. Ulrich Pfammatter, Bauen im Kultur-und klimawandel, 09.10.2012; pp 69, 105, 150-151, 187 
 Stephan Goetz, MercuryHouseOne	Atlas of World Architecture
 Louisiana Museum, LIVING – Frontiers of Architecture, 18.09.2011; p173
 Carolin Klein, Architecture and Vision, Futuristic: Visions of Future Living, Daab Media; Bilingual edition,  01.04.2012; pp 116–119, 
 Kim Seonwook, Pyo Miyoung, Mobile Architecture: Construction and Design Manual, Dom Publishers, 15.03.2012,  Berlin, 
 Ruth Slavid, Extreme Architecture, 09.09.2009; pp 120, 121, 194-199
 A. Scott Howe Out of this world – The New field of Space Architecture, AIAA (American Inst of Aeronautics & Astronautics), 03.09.2009, 
 Keira Chang, Follow Them into Spacecraft Era, SURFACE China, 01.06.2011, p104-109
 Ouyang Yadan, INTO THE COSMIC LIFE, Art And Design, 137, 01.05.2011, p 180-183
 Beate Bartlmä, Architecture and Vision – Visionäres Denken mit Verantwortung, Architektur, 05/10, 01.07.2010, p 6-8
 Michele Weiss, L’oggetto perfetto, Intelligence in Lifestyle, 23, 01.09.2010, p 133
 Irma Solis, Your Space, Le Fourquet, Iss 13, 20.12.2009, pp 116–120 
 “From Pyramids to Spacecraft” - Architecture and Vision, Space, 496, 01.03.2009, pp 16–19
 Maddalena Dalla Mura, Utopia. Mini abitacoli: gusci in bilico tra attenti consumi d’energia e spazio fruibile, in “CasaVogue”, 2008, 29, April, p. 22
 Maddalena Dalla Mura, Architecture and Vision / Architetture visionarie, in “Auto&Design”, 2008, XXX, 168, 1, January–February, pp. 78–79
 Arredo urbano e paesaggio in Italia. Air Tree, in “Detail,” Italy, 12, December, special issue, pp. 2–4

External links 
 Architecture and Vision
 Digital Life Design
 Gravity Free multidisciplinary design conference (video) Gravity Free multidisciplnary design conference
 ESA, Space Concepts Improve Life in the desert
 The birdhouse Foundation
 Safe: Design Takes on Risk, Museum of Modern Art, New York
 Modern-day Leonardos, Leonardo: Man, Inventor, Genius, Museum of Science and Industry, Chicago

1971 births
Living people
21st-century Italian architects
Italian industrial designers
Italian artists
University of Florence alumni
Technische Universität Darmstadt alumni